There are two species of snake named black-headed ground snake:
 Rhynchocalamus melanocephalus'
 Atractus nigricauda''